Exo Planet #4 – The Elyxion (stylized as EXO PLANET #4 – The EℓyXiOn) was the fourth tour of South Korean-Chinese boy band Exo. The tour was officially announced on October 19, 2017 and began in Seoul's Gocheok Sky Dome on November 24, 2017.

Exo announced the encore of this tour (The Elyxion [dot]) in two cities: Seoul, South Korea from July 13 to 15 and Macau on August 10 and 11.

Concerts

Seoul
 The announcement of the tour was made officially by SM Entertainment in October 2017, starting with three dates in the Gocheok Sky Dome on November 24–26, 2017.
 It was reported that the server of Yes24, one of the official ticketing partners, crashed due to massive site traffic coming in all at once, breaking their own record of ticket selling in 0.2 seconds.
 In addition to being the first artist to perform in Gocheok Sky Dome, on October 10, 2015, Exo became the first artist to perform there on three consecutive days, recording the highest attendance since its opening with over 66,000 fans.

Japan
 During the Fukuoka (Day 1) show, Suho did not perform his "Playboy" solo stage in honor of the passing of labelmate Jonghyun who wrote the song.
 Exo added their new songs "Electric Kiss" and "Cosmic Railway" to the set list for their performances in Saitama and Osaka.

Bangkok
 The tour in Bangkok sold out all three shows with 33,000 tickets in less than five minutes.

Set list

Tour dates

Television broadcasts

Box office score data

See also
 Exo Planet 4 - The Elyxion (dot)

Notes

References

External links
  

2017 concert tours
2018 concert tours
Exo concert tours
K-pop concerts